Allium senescens, commonly called aging chive, German garlic, or broadleaf chives, is a species of flowering plant in the genus Allium (which includes all the ornamental and culinary onions and garlic).

Description 
A bulbous herbaceous perennial, it produces up to 30 pink flowers in characteristic allium umbels in the mid to late summer and grows  in height. The foliage is thin and straplike.

Taxonomy
Two subspecies have been named:
Allium senescens subsp. glaucum
Allium senescens subsp. senescens

Distribution 
Allium senescens is native to northern Europe and Asia, from Siberia to Korea. It has been introduced and naturalized in some parts of Europe, including the Czech Republic and former Yugoslavia.

Uses 
Allium senescens is grown for its ornamental qualities, and as a gene source because of its tertiary genetic relationship to A. cepa (the common onion). In the UK it has received the Royal Horticultural Society’s Award of Garden Merit.

References

External links 

 Rob's plants: Allium senescens
 Fine gardening: Allium senescens
 

senescens
Plants described in 1753
Taxa named by Carl Linnaeus
Flora of Siberia
Flora of the Russian Far East
Flora of Central Asia
Flora of China
Flora of Mongolia
Flora of Korea
Garden plants